Tinemyia is a genus of crane fly in the family Limoniidae.

Distribution
New Zealand.

Species
T. margaritifera Hutton, 1900

References

Limoniidae
Diptera of Australasia